Khalid Ahmed Jamil (born 21 April 1977) is an Indian professional football manager and former player who is the current head coach of I-league second division club FC Bengaluru United.

He is the first Indian permanent head coach of an ISL team and the only Indian coach to qualify for the ISL playoffs. Jamil spent most of his playing career at Mahindra United, Air India and Mumbai. He subsequently went into a career of football management after an early retirement in 2009 due to injuries. He managed several top-flight Indian football clubs like Mohun Bagan, East Bengal, Aizawl, Mumbai and NorthEast United.

Early career
Jamil was born on 21 April 1977 in Kuwait City, Kuwait to Indian Punjabis parents. While in Kuwait, Jamil went to an under-14 camp and met Michel Platini who was then the France national football team's coach. Ever since Platini has been Jamil's favorite player. He then moved to India later and got offered a contract from East Bengal and Mohun Bagan but rejected them as they were sponsored by an alcohol company.

Club career
Jamil started his professional career with Mahindra United of the National Football League in 1997 but did not play during the 1997–98 season and left for Air India in 1998. During the 2000–01 season Jamil made his first professional appearances with Air India and reportedly got an offer to join a football club from Brunei but rejected the offer, which he still regrets. He then went back to Mahindra United in 2002 but barely played due to many injuries which eventually led to early retirement. He then joined Mumbai in 2007 but did not play a single game with them during his two years with the club. In 2009 Jamil announced his retirement.

International career
Jamil made his international debut in a friendly match against Uzbekistan in 1998. He later appeared in 2002 World Cup Qualifiers, where they defeated teams like United Arab Emirates, Brunei and Yemen. India secured 11 points from 6 matches, same as Yemen, but finished behind them due to an inferior goal difference.

He represented the India national team in 12 matches.

Managerial career

Mumbai 
After retiring from playing, Jamil went straight into management and started with his last playing club Mumbai of the I-League in 2009. Mumbai managed to finish at 11th in the table, over relegation zone in the 2009–10 I-League, regarded as a great outcome considering the limited financial resources at his disposal. Jamil led Mumbai to 7th in 2010–11 I-League, and back-to-back 6th placed finishes in 2014-15 and 2015-16, keeping the club in the top-flight for straight seven seasons while lacking financial back-up.

Aizwal 
On 1 January 2017, Jamil was appointed as the head coach of Aizawl. He led the club to 2016–17 I-League title while scripting history as the first club from Northeast India to win the Indian title.

East Bengal 
After the title-winning season with Aizawl, Jamil joined East Bengal as the head coach on 1 July 2017 ahead of the 2017–18 I-League season won a record breaking ₹12.5 million deal, making him the then highest paid Indian coach in the history of India's top-tier leagues.

Mohun Bagan 
On 7 January 2019, Jamil joined Mohun Bagan as the head coach, succeeding Sankarlal Chakraborty for the remainder of the season.

NorthEast United 

On 19 June 2019, Jamil was appointed as head of the academy and assistant coach of the Indian Super League club NorthEast United on a three-year deal. Towards the end of 2019–20 Indian Super League season, NorthEast United dismissed head coach Robert Jarni and appointed Jamil as interim for remaining matches.

Jamil was handed over the interim role again in the 2020–21 season after head coach Gerard Nus parted ways with club mid-season NorthEast United went on a ten-game unbeaten run under him and advanced to 2020–21 Indian Super League playoffs, only for the second time in club's history, and Jamil became the first Indian coach to reach the ISL playoffs.

On 23 October 2021, Jamil was appointed as the head coach of NorthEast United, making him the first Indian permanent head coach of an ISL club. Under his guidance, NorthEast began its 2021–22 Indian Super League campaign on 20 November with a 4–2 loss to Bengaluru FC.

FC Bengaluru United

On 30 May 2022, FC Bengaluru United announced the appointment of Khalid Jamil as their head coach for the upcoming season. Later in 2023, the club participated in prestigious Stafford Challenge Cup, in which they clinched title defeating Chennaiyin FC Reserves in final. On 13 March, he was succeeded by Spanish coach Fernando Santiago Varela in the post.

Managerial statistics

Honours

Player

India
SAFF Championship: 1997

Mahindra United
National Football League: 2005–06
Federation Cup: 2003, 2005 
Durand Cup: 2001 
IFA Shield: 2006

Maharashtra
Santosh Trophy: 1999–2000

Manager

Aizawl FC
I-League: 2016–17

Individual
FPAI Indian Football awards: Coach of the Year (2020–21)

See also
 List of India international footballers born outside India

References

External links

Indian footballers
India international footballers
1977 births
Living people
Indian football managers
Indian football coaches
Mahindra United FC players
Mumbai FC players
Mumbai FC managers
I-League managers
Sportspeople from Kuwait City
Indian expatriates in Kuwait
Association football midfielders
Aizawl FC managers
Mohun Bagan AC managers
East Bengal Club managers
NorthEast United FC managers
Indian Super League head coaches